Financial University under the Government of the Russian Federation (FinU or Financial University) (Russian: Финансовый университет при Правительстве Российской Федерации) is a public university located in Moscow, Russia. It is considered among top five universities in Russia according to Forbes and RBC as well as one of the oldest Russian universities preparing economists, financiers, philosophers, bankers and financial lawyers.

FinU had several bygone names:
 Moscow Institute of Economics and Finance (1919–1946)
 Moscow Finance Institute (1946–1990)
 State Finance Academy (1991–1992)
 Finance Academy under the Government of the Russian Federation (1992–2010)

Financial University consists of eight faculties, 40 departments, three institutes, two high schools, two research institutes, eight centers, two training – science laboratories, a network of regional offices – 11 branches and four offices open in seven regions of Russia.

The university graduates include the third wealthiest person in Russia, Mikhail Prokhorov, Deputy Prime Minister Alexander Khloponin, Finance Minister Anton Siluanov, Governor of Krasnoyarsk Krai Lev Kuznetsov, CEO of Gazprombank Andrey Akimov and some others who have taken up leading positions in politics, business and academia.

History 
History of Financial University started in December 1918 when the People's Finance Commissar decided to create a specialized financial institution of higher education – the first in the history of Russia – Moscow Institute of Economics and Finance. It was opened on 2 March 1919, and its first rector was  – the Moscow State University graduate, the Deputy People's Finance Commissar of RSFSR. In September 1946, the institute was consolidated with Moscow Credit-Economic Institute training students since 1931. As a result of merger of these two institutions of higher education Moscow Finance Institute was formed, with Nikolai Rovinsky as its rector. It began with two thousand students and four faculties: Finance, Economic, Accounting, Credit, Monetary Economics, International Economic Relations. The Military Department opened later, in 1947.

In 1991, Moscow Finance Institute was renamed to "State Finance Academy" and in 1992 Russian President Boris Yeltsin changed its name to the "Finance Academy under the Government of Russian Federation" giving a governmental status to the institution.

In 2009, the Finance Academy celebrated 90 years of its history and received congratulations from numerous business and government officials, including Prime Minister Vladimir Putin and Finance Minister Alexey Kudrin.

On 14 July 2010, the Russian Government approved a new Charter for the institution changing its name from the "Finance Academy" into the "Finance University" and made it an official consultative body to the government.

On 4 March 2011, KPMG opened its own department at the university to enhance cooperation based on lectures and practical activities covering audit, International Financial Reporting Standards, taxation and corporate finance.

In 2011–2012 Financial University finished acquisition of three higher education institutions in Russia: State University of the Russian Ministry of Finance, Tax Academy of the Russian Federation, .

Departments and faculties 
The system of higher education established at Finance University includes:
 a pre-university specialised programme to prepare school pupils for entrance to the university
 university programmes (bachelor's degree – certified specialist's degree – master's degree)
 post-graduate and doctorate studies
 second professional higher education in finance and economics
 short-term professional retraining and skill development
 MBA, EMBA, DBA, and MPA programmes

Faculties 
 Higher School of Management
 School of Economics and Business
 School of Finance
 School of Information Technologies and Big Data Analysis
 School of International Economics Relations
 School of Law
 School of Social Science and Mass Communications
 School of Taxes, Audit, and Business Analysis

Departments 

 Accounting in Business Companies
 Administrative and Data Protection Law
 Applied Mathematics
 Applied Political Science
 Applied Social Science
 Audit and Control
 Accounting in Financial and Not-for-Profit Institutions
 Banks and Bank Management
 Business Informatics
 Civil Law
 Computer Science and Programming
 Corporate Governance
 Corporate Finance
 Financial Management
 General Political Science
 Insurance Business
 Investment and Innovations
 Macroeconomics
 Managerial Accounting
 Mathematics
 Macroeconomic Regulation
 Economic Analysis
 Probability Theory and Mathematical Statistics
 Property Valuation and Management
 Public Administration and Municipal Management
 Public Financial Control and Treasury
 Risk Analysis and Economic Security
 Tax Consulting
 Tax Law
 Taxes and Taxation
 Theory of Finance
 Human Resource Management
 Information Security
 Theory and History of State and Law
 Civil and Arbitration Procedure
 Constitutional and Municipal Law
 Criminal Law and Criminal Procedure
 Emergency Management
 Entrepreneurial Law
 Marketing and Logistics
 Microeconomics
 Systematic Economic Analysis
 Statistics
 Applied Psychology
 Foreign Languages
 Philosophy
 Russian Language
 Ernst & Young Department
 KPMG Department

Academics

Admissions 
Admission requirements are among the highest in Russia. In 2009 Finance University received 80 applications per one budget place. According to the research published by State University – Higher School of Economics, successful applicant of the year 2009 required to have on average 85 points of the Unified State Examination score in each subject in order to enter the course.

Research profile 
Finance University actively carries out research activities. These include both fundamental and applied research in the areas of finance, money circulation and credit, insurance, accounting and audit, business evaluation, international monetary relations; research done for post doctoral and PhD dissertations; development of expert-and-analytical materials requested by the bodies of legislative and executive power; organisation of scientific events (conferences, seminars, "roundtables", etc.).

Reputation and rankings 
Based on the average score of the Unified State Examination in 2010, the university is ranked number 5 overall out of 476 Russian institutions of higher education and number 3 among institutions specializing in social sciences. Integrated ranking of the Russian journal "Finance"  put the Financial University as the best higher institution for economics and finance in 2010. The university became the competition winner “Golden Medal “European Quality” in the category of "100 Best Institutions of Higher Education in Russia". Furthermore, according to the ranking of Huazhong University of Science and Technology, the Finance University is placed third among top 100 Russia's institutions of higher education. The Financial University was also ranked among 32 best business schools in the world (1st in Russia and 16th in Europe) in 2013 by the "Ranking Web of World Business Schools".

Academic Publishing

Review of Business and Economics Studies
 Review of Business and Economics Studies (also known as RoBES) is a quarterly  peer-reviewed academic journal covering economics and business. It was established in 2013. It is published by Financial University under the Government of the Russian Federation.

Aim and scope
The Review of Business and Economics Studies aims to select topics in economics and business science that are of interest for decision-makers in business and government, and connect business and state authorities to academia by delivering deep insights.
The Review of Business and Economics Studies defines its scope as covering significant developments in economics and business including macroeconomics, microeconomics, international economics, international finance, international trade, industrial organization, labour economics, political economy, monetary theory, fiscal policy and socioeconomics.

Abstracting and indexing 
The journal is included in the Russian Science Citation Index – a selective component of the Scientific Electronic Library :ru:eLIBRARY.RU. The journal is abstracted and indexed in: Google Scholar, Research Papers in Economics (RePEc), EconPapers – a service of Research Papers in Economics (RePEc), Scilit, ResearchGate, Scientific Electronic Library Cyberleninka, RoBES is included in the Directory of Open Access Journals.
ISSN 2308-944X. eISSN 2587-7089.

Editorial processes
All submissions undergo a double-blind peer review. The review is carried out by the editorial board members and external experts on behalf of the editorial board. All reviewers must be acknowledged experts on the subject of the reviewed materials.

Editors-in-Chief
2023– present: Dr. Pavel S. Seleznev

2013-2022: Dr. Alexander I. Ilyinsky :ru:Ильинский, Александр Иоильевич

Notable papers 
According to Google Scholar, the following three papers have been cited most frequently:

 Dźwigoł H. Interim Management as a New Approach to the Company Management. Review of Business and Economics Studies. 2020;8(1):20-26.
 Anton K. A structural model of exchange rate dynamics. Review of Business and Economics Studies. 2014(3):86-92.
 Eroshkin S.Y., Kallaur G.Y., Papikian L.M. Lean Construction and BIM: Complementing Each Other for Better Project Management. Review of Business and Economics Studies. 2016;4(4):17-22.

Notable alumni 
Among the graduates are:

Academia 
 Alla Gryaznova – economist, former rector and current president of the Finance University
 Mikhail Eskindarov – President of the Finance University

Business 
 Andrey Akimov – CEO and deputy chairman of board of directors of Gazprombank
 Andrey Bokarev – billionaire, chairman of the board of directors of “Kuzbassrazrezugol" Holding Company
 Andrey Borodin –  billionaire, former CEO of the Bank of Moscow
 Bella Zlatkis – deputy chairman of management board at Sberbank, former deputy finance minister of Russia
 Gennady Soldatenkov – deputy president and chairman of the management board of VTB Bank
 Kirill Pisarev – billionaire, co-owner of PIK Group
 Mikhail Alekseev – chairman of the management board of UniCredit Bank
 Konstantin Kagalovsky – billionaire, former vice-president of Yukos and Bank Menatep
 Mikhail Gutseriyev – billionaire, former owner and CEO of Russneft
 Mikail Shishkhanov – billionaire, president and CEO of B&N Bank
 Mikhail Prokhorov – self-made billionaire and oligarch, the second richest man in Russia according to Forbes
 Valeriy Novikov – chief operating officer and member of the executive board of Alfa-Bank
 Vasily Titov – first deputy president and chairman of the management board of VTB Bank
 Vladimir Dmitriev – chairman of Vnesheconombank
 Vladimir Golubkov – chief executive officer of Rosbank

Politics 
 Alexey Navalny – politician, political prisoner, investigative blogger, World Fellow at Yale University's "World Fellows Program, Moscow mayor candidate
 Alexander Khloponin – deputy prime minister and presidential plenipotentiary envoy to the North Caucasian Federal District
 Anton Drozdov – chairman of the pension fund of the Russian Federation
 Anton Siluanov – finance minister of the Russian Federation
 Arseny Zverev – finance minister of the Soviet Government in 1938–1948, and 1948–1960
 Boris Fedorov – economist and reformer, former Finance Minister and Deputy Prime Minister of Russia
 Elena Panina – MP, State Duma of the Russian Federation
 Nadezhda Maksimova – MP, State Duma of the Russian Federation
 N.K. Sokolov – chairman of the board of the USSR State Bank in 1940
 N.V. Garetovsky – chairman of the board of the USSR State Bank in 1987–1989
 Sergey Shakhray – deputy prime minister of Russia in 1991–1996, Russian constitution author and chief of staff of the accounts chamber of the Russian Federation
 Sergei Stepashin – chairman of the accounts chamber of the Russian Federation and former Prime Minister of Russia
 Valentin Pavlov – prime minister of the Cabinet of Ministers of the USSR in 1991, minister of finance in 1989–1990 and chairman of the State Committee on Prices in 1986–1989
 Viktor Gerashchenko – banker and former chairman of the Central Bank of Russia and USSR
 Vladimir Panskov – finance minister of the Russian Federation in 1994–1996, auditor of the accounts chamber of the Russian Federation in 1997–2006

Sport 
 Svetlana Feofanova –  pole vaulter, world champion and holder of silver and bronze medals in 2004 Summer Olympics and  2008 Summer Olympics
 Nathalie Péchalat – French ice dancer, the 2009 French national champion and the 2009 Grand Prix Final bronze medalist
 Khabib Nurmagomedov –mixed martial artist, former UFC Lightweight champion and a two-time Combat Sambo World Champion.

International cooperation 

Before the 2022 Russian invasion of Ukraine and the cutting of academic cooperation with Russia by a significant part of the international community, the Financial University had entered into 17 new agreements with partner institutes of Australia, UK, Germany, Spain, China, United States, Czech Republic and other countries, including:
 Durham University Business School, Durham University, UK – collaboration on exchange of students, academic staff and research projects
 University of Northumbria, UK – double degrees
 University of London,  UK – cooperation in the Bachelor of Science programmes offered through the International Programmes
 Santander, Spain – sponsorship of educational and scientific cooperation programs of the Finance Academy and Spanish universities and establishment of the Research Center for the world financial system
 Frankfurt School of Finance & Management, Germany – joint MBA-Finance degree
 Chinese Academy of Finance and Development, Central University of Finance and Economics, China – cooperation on implementation of bachelor's and master's programmes
 Bloomsburg University of Pennsylvania, United States
 EMLYON Business School, France – double degree programme

International sanctions
Following the 2022 Russian invasion of Ukraine, the government of Ukraine has introduced sanctions against the Financial University, its rector Stanislav Prokofiev, and president Mikhail Eskindarov. In March that year, Prokofiev and Eskindarov had signed an open letter of Russian university rectors supporting the invasion. The sanctions include an indefinite termination of any cultural exchange, scientific cooperation, educational and sports contacts, entertainment programs of Ukrainian entities and persons with the Financial University as well as a visa ban and asset freeze for Prokofiev and Eskindarov.

Other facts 
Financial University is a member of the Russian Law Journal consortium.

See also 
 List of Business Schools in Europe

References

External links 
 
 
 Scientific Electronic Library
 QS Rankings Guide on the Financial University
 Official Website of the Financial University
 Comprehensive Guide on Rankings of Russian Universities Based on Different Criteria (in Russian)

 
Business schools in Russia
Education in Moscow
Educational institutions established in 1919
Government of Russia
1919 establishments in Russia
Sanctioned due to Russo-Ukrainian War
Economics journals
Publications established in 2013
English-language journals
Quarterly journals